In abstract algebra, a monomial ideal is an ideal generated by monomials in a multivariate polynomial ring over a field.

A toric ideal is an ideal generated by differences of monomials (provided the ideal is a prime ideal). An affine or projective algebraic variety defined by a toric ideal or a homogeneous toric ideal is an affine or projective toric variety, possibly non-normal.

Definitions and Properties

The following three conditions are equivalent for an ideal :
  is generated by monomials,
 If , then , provided that  is nonzero.
  is torus fixed, i.e, given , then  is fixed under the action  for all .

We say that  is a monomial ideal if it satisfies any of these equivalent conditions.

Proof:

The following illustrates an example of monomial and polynomial ideals.

Monomial Ideals and Young Diagrams 

A monomial ideal can be interpreted as a Young diagram. The minimal monomial generators of  can be seen as the inner corners of the Young diagram. The minimal generators would determine where we would draw the staircase diagram.
The monomials not in  lie inside the staircase, and these monomials form a vector space basis for the quotient ring .

Consider the following example. 
Let  be a monomial ideal. Hence, .

Thus, monomial ideals can be described by Young diagrams of partitions.

Moreover, the -action on the set of   such that  as a vector space over  has fixed points corresponding to monomial ideals only, which correspond to partitions of size n, which are identified by Young diagrams with n boxes.

Monomial Ordering and Gröbner Basis
A monomial ordering is a well ordering  on the set of monomials such that if  are monomials, then .

Definition

 Consider an ideal , and a fixed monomial ordering.

Note that  in general depends on the ordering used; for example, if we choose the lexicographical order on  subject to x > y, then , but if we take y > x then .

In addition, monomials are present on Gröbner basis and to define the division algorithm for polynomials with several variables. 

As a result,  is generated by the  likewise.

See also 

Stanley–Reisner ring
Hodge algebra

Footnotes

References

Further reading

Homogeneous polynomials
Algebra